James Whatman (1813 – 12 March 1887)
was an English Liberal politician who sat in the House of Commons in two periods between 1852 and 1874.

Whatman was the son of James Whatman of Vinter's, near Maidstone and his wife Eliza Susanna Gaussen, daughter of Samuel Richard Gaussen of Brookman's Park, Hertfordshire. He was educated at Eton College and at Christ Church, Oxford graduating with BA 4th class in classics in 1834 and MA in 1838. He became a Fellow of the Royal Society on 9 January 1840 and was also a Fellow of the Society of Antiquaries. Whatman was a director of the South Eastern Railway.  He was a captain in the West Kent Militia and was a Deputy Lieutenant of London and a Deputy Lieutenant and J.P. for Kent.

Whatman was elected at 1852 general election as one of the two Members of Parliament (MP) for the Maidstone, but at the 1857 general election he did not stand again in Maidstone, and instead won one of the two seats for the Western division of Kent.
He was defeated in that constituency at the 1859 general election.

After a six-year absence, Whatman was returned to the House of Commons at the 1865 election for the borough of Maidstone, and held that seat until he stood down at the 1874 general election.

Whatman married Louisa Isabella Ross, daughter of Charles and Lady Mary Ross in 1850.

Notes

Sources

External links 
 

1813 births
1887 deaths
Alumni of Christ Church, Oxford
Deputy Lieutenants of the City of London
Deputy Lieutenants of Kent
Fellows of the Royal Society
Fellows of the Society of Antiquaries of London
Liberal Party (UK) MPs for English constituencies
People educated at Eton College
UK MPs 1852–1857
UK MPs 1857–1859
UK MPs 1865–1868
UK MPs 1868–1874